Hôtel Drouot is a large auction house in Paris, known for fine art, antiques, and antiquities. It consists of 16 halls hosting 70 independent auction firms, which operate under the umbrella grouping of Drouot.

The firm's main location, called Drouot-Richelieu, is situated on the Rue Drouot in the 9th arrondissement of Paris, on a site once occupied by the Paris Opera's Salle Le Peletier. The nearest Métro station is Richelieu - Drouot.

Other locations are Drouot-Montaigne, Drouot-Montmartre, and Drouot-Véhicules.

Details of forthcoming auctions are published in the weekly Gazette de l'Hôtel Drouot, sold at newsstands and by subscription.

In 2008 Hôtel Drouot was ranked fifth by sales amongst Paris auction houses, after Sotheby's, Christie's, Artcurial, and Ader-Picard-Tajan.

History

The Hôtel Drouot was inaugurated on 1 June 1852. From 1976 to 1980, while its present building was being constructed, sales took place in the former Gare d'Orsay. In 2000, reform of the monopolistic French auction laws, regulated through the system of commissaires-priseurs, opened Drouot up to international competition. It is now owned by a subsidiary of BNP Paribas.

Hundreds of sacred relics were sold at the Hôtel Drouot auctions. Those being sold include Native American, Eskimo and pre-Columbian artefacts. Despite the pleas of the United States embassy, urging a stop to the 2014 sale of items cherished by the Navajo and Hopi people, the items were sold at auction. The Navajo Nation was only able to buy back seven of the possibly 270 items that were being sold.

References
Notes

Sources
 Guillaumin, Paul (1986). Drouot, hier et aujourd'hui. Paris: Les Éditions de l'Amateur.

External links

 
 Gazette de l'Hôtel Drouot
 France Magazine No.62, Summer 2002: "Bidding on a Comeback" by Nicholas Powell

Retail companies established in 1852
French auction houses
Buildings and structures in Paris
Economy of Paris
Buildings and structures in the 9th arrondissement of Paris
1852 establishments in France